The England cricket team toured South Africa from 24 October 1995 to 21 January 1996 for a five-match Test series and a seven-match One Day International (ODI) series against the South African national team. After four consecutive draws, South Africa won the fifth Test to win the series 1–0, before winning the ODI series 6–1, losing only the second ODI.

Squads

Tour matches

Nicky Oppenheimer XI vs England XI

50-over: Easterns vs England XI

First-class: South African Invitational XI vs England XI

First-class: Border vs England XI

First-class: South Africa A vs England XI

First-class: Free State vs England XI

50-over: Free State vs England XI

First-class: Boland vs England XI

50-over: Boland vs England XI

First-class: South African Students XI vs England XI

50-over: Western Province vs England XI

Test series

1st Test

2nd Test

3rd Test

4th Test

5th Test

ODI series

1st ODI

2nd ODI

3rd ODI

4th ODI

5th ODI

6th ODI

7th ODI

References

External links
Series home at ESPNcricinfo

1995 in South African cricket
1996 in South African cricket
International cricket competitions from 1994–95 to 1997
1995 in English cricket
1996 in English cricket
South African cricket seasons from 1970–71 to 1999–2000
1995-96